Aleh Anatolyevich Patotski ((Oleg Patotskiy); born 24 June 1991) is a Belarusian professional football player currently playing for Isloch Minsk Raion.

Honours
BATE Borisov
Belarusian Premier League champion: 2010, 2011

External links
 
 
 

1991 births
Living people
Footballers from Minsk
Belarusian footballers
Association football midfielders
FC BATE Borisov players
FC Dnepr Mogilev players
FC Gorodeya players
FC Isloch Minsk Raion players